Fernando Rojas (2 August 1921 – 26 December 2016) was a Mexican basketball player. He competed in the men's tournament at the 1948 Summer Olympics and the 1952 Summer Olympics.

References

External links
 

1921 births
2016 deaths
Mexican men's basketball players
Olympic basketball players of Mexico
Basketball players at the 1948 Summer Olympics
Basketball players at the 1952 Summer Olympics